Bahasa Binan (or bahasa Béncong) is a distinctive Indonesian speech variety originating from the gay community. It has several regular patterns of word formation and is documented in both writing and speech.
One pattern of word formation modifies standard Indonesian roots (normally composed of two syllables) to have e as the first vowel and ong closing the second syllable—hence providing regular assonance with the standard Indonesian word bencong , a male homosexual, trans woman, or male crossdresser. Another word formation pattern adds -in- infixes to other Indonesian roots. The best example is the word binan itself, formed with the word banci, "male transvestite", to which the -in- infix has been added and from which the second syllable -ci has been dropped. Bahasa Binan also uses a range of standard Indonesian words with altered meaning. The standard word for "cat", kucing, is used in Bahasa Binan to denote a male prostitute. Another word with wide currency in Bahasa Binan, but actually typical of standard Indonesian informal word formation, is waria from wanita (woman) + pria (man), meaning "transvestite".

See also 

 Ablaut
 Affix
 Gayle
 IsiNgqumo
 Morpheme
 Polari
 :id:Betty Bencong Slebor (Indonesian Wikipedia)
 :id:Joko Wiryanto Suwito (Indonesian Wikipedia)

Notes and references

Bibliography 

 Boellstorff, Tom (2007). A coincidence of desires: anthropology, queer studies, Indonesia. Duke University Press. 
 Boellstorf, Tom (2005). The gay archipelago: sexuality and nation in Indonesia. Princeton University Press.
 
 
 Boellstorff, Tom (2003). '"Authentic, of course!": gay language in Indonesia and cultures of belonging'. Chapter 7, pages 181–201 in William Leap, Tom Boellstorff (eds). Speaking in queer tongues: globalization and gay language. University of Illinois Press. 
 Offord, Baden and Leon Cantrell (2001). "Homosexual Rights as Human Rights in Indonesia". Pages 233–252 in Gerard Sullivan and Peter A. Jackson (eds). Gay and lesbian Asia: culture, identity, community. Haworth Press. 
  TYO (2005). "Bahasa 'Binan' dan Trendi". Lampung Post 23 January.

External links 
 GAYa NUSANTARA   – official website of GAYa Nusantara
 Gaya Nusantara – National Library of Australia subscription to GAYa Nusantara
 Bahasa Binan: Detik Forum  – moderated open online forum for Bahasa Binan posts, hosted by detikForum

Society of Indonesia
Languages of Indonesia
LGBT in Indonesia
LGBT linguistics
Cant languages